Caacupé (Guarani: Ka'akupe, literally: "Behind the Mount") is a city and district in Paraguay. It is the capital of the department of Cordillera.

The town was founded in 1770 by Carlos Murphy, a grenadier in the service of King Charles III of Spain, although a first settlement existed here from the 17th century.

The city is the seat of the Roman Catholic Diocese of Caacupé. The Cathedral Basilica of Our Lady of Miracles, Caacupé stands in the centre of the town. A major religious festival is held annually on 8 December in honour of the statuette "Our Lady of the Miracles". This statuette, carved in the 16th century by a devout convert, was miraculously saved from a great flood, and numerous miracles are ascribed to it.

During the rest of the year Caacupé is a quiet provincial town. It has a  park with amusements.

Photogallery

References

External list
Official website

Caacupé District
Populated places established in 1770
1770 establishments in the Spanish Empire